The Rochester Knighthawks are a lacrosse team based in Rochester, New York playing in the National Lacrosse League (NLL). The 2023 season will be the team's 3rd season in the league. The original Knighthawks moved to Halifax for the 2019/2020 season to become the Halifax Thunderbirds.

Regular season

Current standings

Game log

Roster

Entry Draft
The 2022 NLL Entry Draft took place on September 10, 2022. The Knighthawks made the following selections:

References

Rochester Knighthawks seasons
Rochester Knighthawks
Rochester Knighthawks